League of Legends Champions Korea (LCK) is the primary competition for League of Legends esports in South Korea. Contested by ten teams, the league runs two seasons per year and serves as a direct route to qualification for the annual League of Legends World Championship. The LCK is administered in cooperation between Riot Games and KeSPA.

The league was formerly named League of Legends Champions before undergoing a major restructuring in late 2014, which saw a change in the competition's format and a rebranding to its current name. OGN reserved exclusive broadcasting rights of the league until 2016 when rights were split with SPOTV Games. In 2019, Riot Games took over the broadcasting of LCK. In 2021 the LCK franchised, and Challengers Korea (CK) and the LCK promotion tournament were discontinued.

The LCK is considered one of the strongest League of Legends competitions in the world, with teams from the league winning the World Championship a record seven times, including five consecutive titles from 2013 to 2017.

History

Pre-LCK era (2012–2014) 
Following the launch of South Korea's League of Legends server in December 2011, cable broadcaster OnGameNet launched the country's first major League of Legends tournament in March 2012. Named The Champions Spring 2012, the tournament ran from March to May and was contested by a total of 16 teams. MiG Blaze was crowned the competition's inaugural champion after defeating their organizational sibling team MiG Frost in the finals. The Champions Summer 2012 followed later that year, with a rebranded MiG Frost, now known as Azubu Frost, claiming the title themselves. Azubu Frost, along with NaJin Sword, went on to represent South Korea in their first appearance at the League of Legends World Championship in October.

A tri-tournament annual circuit was soon set as the norm for the league's calendar year, now consisting of three seasons held in the winter, spring, and summer. Azubu Frost and NaJin Sword clashed early in 2013 in the finals of Champions Winter 2012–13, with the latter emerging victorious. Champions Spring 2013 and Champions Summer 2013 later followed, being won by MVP Ozone and SK Telecom T1 K respectively. SK Telecom T1 K went on to win the Season 3 World Championship later that year, becoming the first team from the league to do so.

SK Telecom T1 K became the first team to successfully defend their title the following year, sweeping Samsung Galaxy Ozone in the finals of Champions Winter 2013–14 to cap off an undefeated tournament run. Ozone's sibling team, Samsung Galaxy Blue, went on to win Champions Spring 2014 but were bested in the finals of Champions Summer 2014 by kt Rolster Arrows.

In October 2014, plans were announced for a drastic overhaul of the league's structure. League of Legends Champions was rebranded to League of Legends Champions Korea (LCK), and the winter season was abolished in favor of an annual circuit consisting of the Spring Split and Summer Split. The competition's format, which consisted of a 16-team tournament with a group stage progressing into a knockout stage, was changed to a 10-team league operating on a round-robin basis, with the top 5 teams qualifying for a playoffs bracket. Furthermore, organizations were prohibited from owning more than one team - in particular, this change most heavily affected KeSPA-affiliated teams, all of which operated two squads as part of a sibling team system - forcing numerous organizations to merge or disband rosters.

LCK era (since 2015) 

LCK Spring 2015 marked the debut of the league operating under its new format and identity. A newly minted SK Telecom T1, a product of the prior year's merger between SK Telecom T1 K and SK Telecom T1 S, swept the calendar year by winning both LCK Spring 2015 and LCK Summer 2015.

SK Telecom T1 retained their crown in LCK Spring 2016, becoming the first team in competition history to win three consecutive titles. Their streak of dominance was ended in LCK Summer 2016 by ROX Tigers, who became only the second team to win the league since its restructuring.

SK Telecom T1 won their sixth title as an organization on 22 April 2017, by defeating KT Rolster in the finals of LCK Spring 2017. In LCK Summer 2017 Finals, Longzhu Gaming won their first title on 26 August 2017 after defeating the spring winner SK Telecom T1.

Longzhu Gaming rebranded to Kingzone DragonX following the 2017 World Championship, and they defended their title in LCK 2018 Spring by defeating the Afreeca Freecs. kt Rolster won the LCK Summer 2018 championship, defeating Griffin in the finals.

SK Telecom T1 won the LCK Spring 2019 title after defeating Griffin in the finals with 3–0. This marked the seventh LCK title for SK Telecom T1. On 31 August 2019, SK Telecom T1 once again defeated Griffin in the finals with a score of 3–1. This was their eighth championship title, and also their back-to-back LCK title in 2019.

T1 also won the LCK Spring 2020 title after defeating Gen.G in the finals (3–0), taking the title for the third time in a row. The title also marked the organization's ninth championship title, and their first after rebranding from SK Telecom T1 to T1. In LCK Summer 2020, Damwon Gaming won their first championship title after defeating DRX in the finals.

DWG KIA (previously Damwon Gaming) won the title for both LCK Spring and Summer 2021, making them the champions for three consecutive splits. They defeated Gen.G in the Spring, and T1 in the Summer.

On 2 April 2022, T1 won the LCK Spring 2022 title after defeating Gen.G in the finals. This marked their tenth championship title.

Format

Regular season 
 Ten teams participate
 Double round robin, all matches are best-of-three
 The best six teams advance to the playoffs
 The top two teams get byes into the semifinals
 If two teams have the same record, ties are broken by:
 Game record (teams get +1 point for a won game and –1 point for a lost game; the team with more points wins the tie)
 If points are tied, ties are broken by head-to-head record
 If still tied, teams play a tiebreaker match

Playoffs 
 The top six teams participate in the playoffs
 Single-elimination, double bracket format
 All matches are best-of-five
 The winner of the Spring Season qualify for the Mid-Season Invitational
 The winner of the Summer Season (seed 1), the team with the most championship points (seed 2), and both finalists of the regional qualifier (seed 3 and 4) qualify for the World Championship.

Teams 
As of 9 January 2023

Results

By season 
{{legend|#b6fcb6|Background shading indicates that the team won the world championship.|text=}}

 By team 
Teams in italics'' indicate teams that have been disbanded or no longer participates in the league.

References

External links 
 

 
2012 establishments in South Korea
Recurring sporting events established in 2012
Sports leagues in South Korea